Hugh Ford Crighton (1824–1886) was a successful Scottish portrait artist in the 19th century. Largely known for commissioned portraits, the works (which frequently appear at auction) are largely now "anonymous" in their subject matter as the sitters are not recorded on the paintings.

Life

He was born in Dalmellington, Ayrshire in 1824 the son of a Scots Guard who had fought at Waterloo. He originally trained as a tailor.

He studied in Edinburgh and Paris. His fame as a portrait artist appears to have quickly spread from around 1845 onwards.
As a successful Victorian artist Crighton could afford a very large flat, living at 40 Great King Street in Edinburgh's Second New Town. He left Edinburgh in the 1860s and moved to Sheffield.

He sat on Sheffield Town Council 1869 to 1877 and lived and worked in that town for 30 years. His work here includes portraits of many of Sheffield's figures of note. He lived at 1 East Parade in Sheffield.

In 1881 he returned to Scotland, living at 6 Broomhill Terrace West, in Partick.

Known Works
See
John Smith Esq, Mayor of East Retford, Retford Town Hall
Thomas Jessop, Mayor of Sheffield, Sheffield Town Hall
Thomas Moore, Mayor of Sheffield, Sheffield Town Hall
William Jeffcock, First Mayor of Sheffield, Sheffield Town Hall
Thomas Moore (in official regalia), Mayor of Sheffield, Sheffield Town Hall
Christopher Thomson: sailor, comedian, artist and author, Sheffield Museums
Self-portrait, Sheffield Museum
Henry Seebohm, Sheffield Museum
Thomas Jessop, in his role as Founder of Sheffield Hospital, Sheffield Teaching Hospitals
George Barnsley, (Master Cutler 1883) painted pre 1881
W. C. Leng (1868) (location unknown)
W. F. Dixon (location unknown)
Dr Falding
Dr Henry Merryweather (1820-1882)
Mary Emmeline Hill-Merryweather (1825-1906)
R. N. Philips

References

1824 births
1886 deaths
British artists
People from East Ayrshire
People associated with Edinburgh